The 1983–84 UEFA Cup was the 13th season of the UEFA Cup, the third-tier club football competition organised by the Union of European Football Associations (UEFA). It was won by English club Tottenham Hotspur, who beat Belgian side Anderlecht on penalties, after the final finished 2–2 on aggregate.

Association ranking

For the 1983–84 UEFA Cup, the associations are allocated places according to their 1982 UEFA country coefficients, which takes into account their performance in European competitions from 1977–78 to 1981–82.

(*) As Albania withdrew.

Teams

The labels in the parentheses show how each team qualified for competition:
TH: Title holders
CW: Cup winners
CR: Cup runners-up
LC: League Cup winners
2nd, 3rd, 4th, 5th, 6th, etc.: League position
P-W: End-of-season European competition play-offs winners

First round

|}

First leg

Second leg

Inter Bratislava won 16–0 on aggregate.

Radnički Niš won 5–1 on aggregate.

Royal Antwerp won 8–3 on aggregate.

Budapest Honvéd won 3–2 on aggregate.

Lokomotive Leipzig won 7–2 on aggregate.

Sparta Rotterdam won 5–1 on aggregate.

Spartak Moscow won 7–0 on aggregate.

Verona won 4–2 on aggregate.

1–1 on aggregate; Hajduk Split won 3–1 on penalties.

Nottingham Forest won 3–0 on aggregate.

Baník Ostrava won 6–1 on aggregate.

PSV Eindhoven won 6–2 on aggregate.

Austria Wien won 15–0 on aggregate.

PAOK won 5–2 on aggregate.

Werder Bremen won 3–2 on aggregate.

2–2 on aggregate; Widzew Łódź won on away goals.

Celtic won 5–1 on aggregate.

Sturm Graz won 2–1 on aggregate.

Levski Sofia won 2–1 on aggregate.

Bayern Munich won 11–0 on aggregate.

Groningen won 4–2 on aggregate.

Anderlecht won 4–1 on aggregate.

Laval won 1–0 on aggregate.

Carl Zeiss Jena won 3–0 on aggregate.

Lens won 3–2 on aggregate.

Feyenoord won 3–0 on aggregate.

Watford won 4–3 on aggregate.

Tottenham Hotspur won 14–0 on aggregate.

Internazionale won 2–1 on aggregate.

Aston Villa won 5–1 on aggregate.

Sparta Prague won 4–3 on aggregate.

Sporting CP won 4–3 on aggregate.

Second round

|}

First leg

Second leg

Sparta Prague won 3–1 on aggregate.

Hajduk Split won 5–3 on aggregate.

Anderlecht won 4–2 on aggregate.

Radnički Niš won 6–3 on aggregate.

Sparta Rotterdam won 4–3 on aggregate.

Watford won 4–2 on aggregate.

2–2 on aggregate; Sturm Graz won on away goals.

Austria Wien won 5–3 on aggregate.

Lokomotive Leipzig won 2–1 on aggregate.

0–0 on aggregate; Bayern Munich won 9–8 on penalties.

Lens won 5–4 on aggregate.

Tottenham Hotspur won 6–2 on aggregate.

Internazionale won 5–3 on aggregate.

Spartak Moscow won 4–3 on aggregate.

Nottingham Forest won 3–1 on aggregate.

Celtic won 5–2 on aggregate.

Third round

|}

First leg

Second leg

Sturm Graz won 2–1 on aggregate.

Hajduk Split won 4–0 on aggregate.

Sparta Prague won 7–2 on aggregate.

Anderlecht won 2–1 on aggregate.

Austria Wien won 3–2 on aggregate.

Nottingham Forest won 2–1 on aggregate.

Tottenham Hotspur won 2–1 on aggregate.

Spartak Moscow won 3–1 on aggregate.

Quarter-finals

|}

First leg

Second leg

Hajduk Split won 2–1 on aggregate.

Nottingham Forest won 2–1 on aggregate.

Tottenham Hotspur won 4–2 on aggregate.

Anderlecht won 4–3 on aggregate.

Semi-finals

|}

In 1997, it was revealed that the Anderlecht chairman Constant Vanden Stock had paid a £27,000 bribe to the referee Emilio Guruceta Muro in exchange for help fixing their semi-final second leg match versus Nottingham Forest. During the match, Anderlecht were awarded a dubious penalty, and a last minute Nottingham Forest goal—that would have won them the tie on the away goals rule—was disallowed. In 2016, it emerged that UEFA had known about the bribe since 1993 but had taken no action until the information was made public in 1997, when UEFA suspended Anderlecht from the next European tournament for which they qualified. On qualifying for the 1998–99 UEFA Cup, Anderlecht appealed the suspension in the Court of Arbitration for Sport, which overturned the ban on the grounds that it was made by UEFA's executive committee, which did not have the authority to issue the ban.

First leg

The match featured an infamous incident that saw a Hajduk fan (later identified as Ante Baraba, a resident of Paljuv settlement within the Novigrad village) run onto the pitch before the start of the second half with a live rooster – in reference to Tottenham's club symbol, the cockerel – and, while standing at the centre circle, kill the animal by snapping its neck. The contest took place as scheduled, however, as a result of the incident, Hajduk was fined CHF3,000 and ordered to play at least 300 km away from their home stadium for their next European tie that turned out to be the 1984–85 European Cup Winners' Cup first round game against Dynamo Moscow.

Second leg

Anderlecht won 3–2 on aggregate.

2–2 on aggregate; Tottenham Hotspur won on away goals.

Final

First leg

Second leg

2–2 on aggregate; Tottenham Hotspur won 4–3 on penalties.

Top scorers

References

External links
1983–84 All matches UEFA Cup – season at UEFA website
Official Site
Results at RSSSF.com
All scorers 1983–84 UEFA Cup according to protocols UEFA
1983/84 UEFA Cup – results and line-ups (archive)

UEFA Cup seasons
2